The men's doubles tournament at the 1984 French Open was held from 26 May until 10 June 1984 on the outdoor clay courts at the Stade Roland Garros in Paris, France. Henri Leconte and Yannick Noah won the title, defeating Pavel Složil and Tomáš Šmíd in the final.

Seeds

Draw

Finals

Top half

Section 1

Section 2

Bottom half

Section 3

Section 4

External links
 Association of Tennis Professionals (ATP) – main draw
1984 French Open – Men's draws and results at the International Tennis Federation

Men's Doubles
French Open by year – Men's doubles